Merrick Park or Meyrick Park may refer to:

 Merrick Park (Springfield, Massachusetts), part of Springfield's Quadrangle
 Village of Merrick Park, a shopping mall in Coral Gables, Florida
Meyrick Park, Bournemouth, an area of Bournemouth